Ostovar may refer to:

Ostovar, a Persian word equivalent to the English-speaking ranks of warrant officers or sergeant majors. See Rank insignia of the Iranian military#Ostovar
Houshang Ostovar or Hoochang Ostovar (1927–2016), Persian symphonic music composer and instructor